Orie is a village of approximately 3,000 people, and located in the Isoko South local government area of Delta state, Nigeria. It is also called Orie-Irri because its inhabitants are generally believed to have originally migrated from Irri town. Orie is surrounded by three villages: Opke, Ofagbe and Utue.

Populated places in Isoko South